Daniel Hiester (1774March 8, 1834) was an American political leader from Pennsylvania.
Daniel was a member of the Hiester family political dynasty.  He was the son of
John Hiester and nephew of U.S. Rep. Daniel Hiester (17471804) and Gabriel Hiester.

Biography
Daniel Hiester was born in Chester County in the Province of Pennsylvania in 1774.  He married Catherine Titlow.

Hiester was elected prothonotary and clerk of the courts of Chester County in
1800 and continued to serve until 1809.

Hiester was elected to the Eleventh Congress in 1808. He served in the United States House of Representatives from March 4, 1809 to March 3, 1811.

After his congressional career, Hiester helped establish the Bank of Chester County, was burgess of West Chester, Pennsylvania from 1815 to 1817, and was appointed  register of wills and recorder of deeds on February 28, 1821.

He died in Hagerstown, Maryland on March 8, 1834.  He was buried in the Congressional Cemetery in Washington, D.C.

Sources

The Political Graveyard

1774 births
1834 deaths
Hiester family
People from Chester County, Pennsylvania
Pennsylvania Dutch people
Democratic-Republican Party members of the United States House of Representatives from Pennsylvania
Pennsylvania prothonotaries
19th-century American politicians
Burials at the Congressional Cemetery
People of colonial Pennsylvania